Asia Art Archive (AAA) is a nonprofit organisation based in Hong Kong which focuses on documenting the recent history of contemporary art in Asia within an international context. AAA incorporates material that members of local art communities find relevant to the field, and provides educational and public programming. In 2016, AAA is one of the most comprehensive publicly accessible collections of research materials in the field,  and has initiated about 150 public, educational, and residential programmes.

AAA is a registered charity in Hong Kong and that is governed by a board of directors and guided by a rotating Advisory Board. The collection is accessible free of charge at AAA in Hong Kong’s Sheung Wan District at 233 Hollywood Road, and searchable via an online catalog.

International locations are based in New York (Asia Art Archive in America) and New Delhi (Asia Art Archive in India).

History
Asia Art Archive was founded in 2000 by Claire Hsu, Johnson Chang Tsong-zung and Ronald Arculli with a mandate to document and secure the multiple recent histories of contemporary art in the region. Hsu became its first Executive Director.

In 10 years, AAA has collected over 33,000 titles related to contemporary art. 
The Archive has organised more than 150 programmes and projects beyond its library and archival activities. These range from research-driven projects and discursive gatherings to residencies and youth and community projects.

Speakers at public talks and symposia have included Ai Weiwei, Tobias Berger, David Elliott, Htein Lin, Huang Yongping, Yuko Hasegawa, Jun Nguyen-Hatsushiba, Xu Bing, and Mariko Mori.

In 2007, AAA launched a residency programme to encourage new readings of the physical material in the Archive, to offer individuals the chance to work with material outside their usual concentrations, and to support projects around the idea of the ‘archive’. International residents have included Raqs Media Collective and Young-hae Chang Heavy Industries; local residents have included art critic and curator Jasper Lau Kin Wah, and artists Cedric Maridet, Pak Sheung Chuen, and Wong Wai Yin.

AAA has also initiated focused research projects that build areas of specialization in the collection. These include the recently completed four-year project ‘Materials of the Future: Documenting Contemporary Chinese Art 1980-1990’ which focused on performance art in the region, the digitisation of the personal archives of Geeta Kapur and Vivan Sundaram from Delhi, and the current digitisation of the archives of Ray Langenbach from Malaysia, Natasha Salon in Hanoi, and Blue Space in Ho Chi Minh City.

The chair of the board since 2003 is Jane DeBevoise.

Archive Acquisition
The Archive's collection policy is designed to reflect the priorities of local and regional artists, art organizations, galleries, critics, and academics. In December 2017, there were more than 50,000 records available through the online library catalogue. About 70% of AAA’s acquisitions are donations; some are unsolicited but many are gathered by AAA’s researchers, who are based in cities across Asia including Hong Kong, Beijing, Taipei, Seoul, Manila,  Tokyo and New Delhi.

AAA's Special Collections
AAA’s Special Collections include primary source documents such as artists’ writings, sketches, and original visual documentation. As well as personal material donated by individuals, there are rare periodicals and publications. The archive keeps files of individuals, events, and organizations, and produces some of its own material, including images and audio-visual material.

AAA’s Special Collections include original sketches and texts by artists, including Roberto Chabet (The Philippines), Ha Bik Chuen  (China), Lu Peng (China), Mao Xuhui (China), Wu Shanzhuan (China), and Zhang Xiaogang (China). The archive has an ongoing project in collaboration with ARTstor to digitize the collection, with plans to make the scans available online through the two organizations' websites.

Selected projects
Space Traffic - Symposium of International Artist's Spaces (2001): This symposium, co-organized by AAA, Para/Site, and West Space, investigated issues, problems, and possibilities faced by alternative art spaces and made possible direct dialogue between art spaces of this kind across Asia.
Contemporary Asian Art Forum: Links, Platforms, Network (2003): Jointly presented by AAA and the Cultural Co-operation Forum organized by the Hong Kong Government Home Affairs Bureau, this symposium brought together artists, curators, and art professionals from Asia to discuss the building and sustaining of links, platforms, and networks in the contemporary Asian art arena.
Archiving the Contemporary: Documenting Asian Art Today, Yesterday and Tomorrow (2005): ‘Archiving the Contemporary’ was a workshop that brought together over 40 art professionals from around the world to look at the problematics of archiving, collection policies, classification systems, technological advancement, preservation, knowledge management, and information sharing in relation to contemporary art from Asia.
All You Want to Know about International Art Biennials (2006 – ongoing): This online project charts and maps the modes, development, and diversities of international biennials and triennials worldwide, serving as a research tool and illustrating a comprehensive overview of the ‘biennial phenomenon’. The project is a collaboration with Art Map Limited.
Archiving Artist-run Spaces (2007): This series of talks examined six artist-run spaces in Manila that were centres for Filipino contemporary art, including Pinaglabanan Gallery, The Junk Shop, Third Space, Surrounded By Water, Big Sky Mind, and Future Prospects.
Build Your Dream Museum Collection Everyday! (2008/2009): In 2008, 10,000 ‘Dream Museum’ cards were distributed to the community, offering a platform for the public to consider and describe its ideal museum. AAA set up a booth at ART HK 08, providing a platform for interactive engagement with the ongoing education project, and artist workshops were conducted throughout the four-day event. In 2009, as Hong Kong embarked on the West Kowloon Cultural District project, AAA called on the community to build a collection for the ‘Dream Museum’ by sending in an object or uploading an image on www.dreammuseum.org. Taking Thai respondent Sarawut Chutiwongpeti’s suggestion for the ‘Dream Museum’ to be ‘Like 7-Eleven’, AAA established the ‘Dream Museum Convenience Store’ at ART HK 09. Participants were asked to bring images or objects to AAA’s booth to contribute to the ‘collection’. On-site workshops with artists, curators, designers, and architects facilitated the discussion.
Backroom Conversations (annually since 2008): As the official educational partner of ART HK (Hong Kong International Art Fair), AAA presents an annual series of panel discussions and screenings with leading experts and practitioners in the field that touch on prevalent issues and offer a first-hand look into the contemporary art world today. Topics have included ‘Reinvesting in Contemporary Chinese Art’; ‘Heritage Sites: the Answer to Hong Kong’s Arts Needs?’; ‘Artist as Activist, Art as Catalyst’; and ‘In the Aftermath of the White Cube: Museums and Other Spaces’. Speakers have included Ron Arad, Sabine Breitwieser, Johnson Chang, David Elliott, Yuko Hasegawa, Manray Hsu, Hu Fang, Eungie Joo, Vasif Kortun, Barbara London, Charles Merewether, Frances Morris, Alexandra Munroe, Martha Rosler, Rirkrit Tiravanija, Sheena Wagstaff, Ada Wong, Wong Hoy Cheong, Pauline Yao, and Daniela Zyman, among others. Originally named Hong Kong Conversations, the series was renamed in 2009.
Pool of Possibilities: Mapping Currents of the 3rd Guangzhou Triennial (2008): In collaboration with the 3rd Guangzhou Triennial, this project maps the network of connections between artists’ practices in the form of an online database that linked artists from across the world through a variety of mediums and concepts.
The Anxious Century: Discourses Waiting To Be Born: a Seminar on Art Criticism (2008): This two-day seminar was jointly presented by AAA, NuqtaArt, a Karachi-based art publication, and the Goethe-Institut in Karachi. It brought together cultural workers, critics, and scholars from Sri Lanka, Bangladesh, Germany, and India to probe the birth of new discourse within South Asian art in the twenty-first century, and explored the possible reclamation of old dialogues within South Asian art through the lens of post-colonialism. AAA hosted a panel discussion that looked at the challenge of building art archives with collective solutions and shared expertise.
Shifting Sites: Cultural Desire and the Museum (2008): AAA and The Department of Cultural and Religious Studies at The Chinese University of Hong Kong invited key individuals and institutions to address relevant issues and share their insights and experiences on the roles of museums. The ‘Shifting Sites’ conference included keynote speeches, presentations, reports, and group discussions that raised awareness about current debates surrounding contemporary museum practices in Asia.
Action Script –Symposium on Performance Art Practice and Documentation in Asia (2010): This five-day symposium, co-presented with the Centre for Community Cultural Development, brought internationally respected performance artists, archivists, and researchers together in Hong Kong to consider the practice of performance art in Asia and to critically discuss the challenges associated with archiving performance work or ‘live art’.
From Jean-Paul Sartre to Teresa Teng: Contemporary Cantonese Art in the 1980s (2010): Drawn from primary research, rare film footage, and 14 interviews with artists, curators, and historians active in the Guangdong region during the 1980s collected as part of the research for the film From Jean-Paul Sartre to Teresa Teng: Contemporary Cantonese Art in the 1980s.
Materials of the Future: Documenting Contemporary Chinese Art from 1980–1990 (2010): In 2006, AAA began locating, collecting, and preserving a large body of important material from the 1980s, a period in China’s art history that was in danger of being lost. At the same time, AAA conducted a series of in-depth professional interviews with artists, critics, and curators of the 1980s in an attempt to record this period of contemporary Chinese art. With more than 70,000 digital documents, AAA now maintains the world’s largest and most systematically organized archive of documentary material about Chinese art made during the 1980s. The project culminated in September 2010 with the launch of the website www.china1980s.org

References

Further reading
Acret, Susan. "An Archive Of Visions" Asian Art News 13.5 (2003): 68–69.
Kember, Pamela. "Les Archives de l’Art asiatique" Paroles January–February (2002): 12–13.
Choy, Lee Weng. "Tomorrow’s Local Library: The Asia Art Archive in Context" Yishu: Journal of Contemporary Art 4.4 (2005):15–23.
Huang Yin. "The Asia Art Archive: Keeping the Present for the Future" Orientations 36.5 (2005) 69–71.

External links
 Asia Art Archive
 Asia Art Archive America
 Online Catalogue
 China 1980s Project
 Forbeschina.com: AAA Bridges the Gap

Asian art museums in Hong Kong
2000 establishments in Hong Kong
Art museums established in 2000